Hafeezpet is a neighbourhood in Hyderabad, India. It is close to Kukatpally, Madhapur and Miyapur. It is administered as Ward No. 109 of Greater Hyderabad Municipal Corporation.

Public transport
It has MMTS Railway Station and the TSRTC Bus Number for Hafeezpet are 222 (Koti-Lingampally-Patanchoru), 10H (Allwayn Colony - Secundrabad), 216 k/l (Lingampally  - Mehdipatnam).

As it is located within the city it has all mode of transport. The aip code for Hafeezpet is 500049  Miyapur PO.

References

Neighbourhoods in Hyderabad, India
Municipal wards of Hyderabad, India